Pär Arne Lindström (born 29 October 1970 in Linköping, Östergötland) is a former freestyle swimmer from Sweden. He competed twice at the Summer Olympics for his native country, in 1992 and 1996, both in the Men's 50m Freestyle. He later was affiliated with the University of California in Berkeley, California and would earn an MBA from Harvard Business School.

Clubs
Katrineholms Simsällskap

References

1970 births
Living people
Swimmers at the 1992 Summer Olympics
Swimmers at the 1996 Summer Olympics
Olympic swimmers of Sweden
University of California, Berkeley alumni
Swedish male freestyle swimmers
Sportspeople from Linköping
Sportspeople from Östergötland County
Harvard Business School alumni